John B. Mansbridge (March 20, 1917 – January 11, 2016)  was an American art director. He was nominated for two Academy Awards in the category Best Art Direction. He won the lifetime achievement award at the Art Directors Guild in 2006. He also won a Primetime Emmy Award in 1988 for Outstanding Art Direction for a Series, for the television series Beauty and the Beast.

Selected filmography
Mansbridge was nominated for two Academy Awards for Best Art Direction:
 Bedknobs and Broomsticks (1971)
 The Island at the Top of the World (1974)
He won the Primetime Emmy Award for Outstanding Art Direction in a Series:
 Beauty and the Beast (1988)

References

External links

1917 births
2016 deaths
American art directors
Emmy Award winners
People from Jackson County, South Dakota